The 2005 SAP Open was a men's tennis tournament played on indoor hard courts. It was the 117th edition of the event and was part of the International Series of the 2005 ATP Tour. It took place at the HP Pavilion in San Jose, United States, from February 7 through February 13, 2005. First-seeded Andy Roddick won his second consecutive singles title at the event.

Finals

Singles

 Andy Roddick defeated  Cyril Saulnier, 6–0, 6–4
It was Andy Roddick's 1st title of the year, and his 16th overall. It was his 2nd win at the event.

Doubles

 Wayne Arthurs /  Paul Hanley defeated  Yves Allegro /  Michael Kohlmann, 7–6(7–4), 6–4

References

SAP Open
SAP Open
SAP Open
SAP Open
SAP Open